is a mountain in Nishiwaki, Hyōgo Prefecture, Japan. This mountain is one of the Hyōgo 50 Mountains.

Outline 
Mount Haku is a mountain in the Chūgoku Mountains. The name Hakusan is from the name of the shrine, "Hakusan Gongen," which was on the top of the mountain. The Hakusan Gongen was a branch of a sect of Shinto, whose center is on the top of Mount Haku with the same name, on the border of Ishikawa, Fukui and Gifu prefectures. Mount Haku was a center of Shugendō in this region, and Sogon-ji on the foot of the mountain was a place for worship to this mountain

Access 
Honkuroda Station of JR West Kakogawa Line

References

Official Home Page of the Geographical Survey Institute in Japan

Haku
Shugendō